Louise Sacchi (April 15, 1913 – March 22, 1997) was an aviator and author who flew numerous times across the world's oceans, often solo, ferrying single and multi-engine planes. As the first international woman ferry pilot, she piloted planes across the Pacific and Atlantic oceans over 340 times, more than any other non-airline pilot.

Records and Races 
On June 28, 1971, she set a women's speed record by flying a single-engine land plane from New York to London in 17 hours and 10 minutes, a record that still stands today. Following the New York to London flight on July 1, 1971 she departed Abingdon, England, on the first leg of a seven-day air race to Victoria, B.C., Canada. She finished 2nd in class and tied with Race 31 for overall eighth.

Legacy 
Sacchi won numerous awards in her career, which spanned over 40 years, and was the first woman to win the prestigious Godfrey L. Cabot Award for distinguished service to aviation.

Publications
Ocean Flying, McGraw-Hill, 1979, 
The Happy Commuter - Autobiographical Sketches, 1996, Louise Sacchi.

References

External links
Explorers Archive Louise Sacchi Biography
Sacchi Avenue, Gander, Newfoundland

American aviators
1913 births
1997 deaths
American aviation record holders
American women aviation record holders
20th-century American women
20th-century American people